The Illinois Fighting Illini men's tennis team is an NCAA Division I college tennis team competing in the Big Ten Conference. The team plays its home matches at the Atkins Tennis Center in Urbana, Illinois.

History
The Illinois men's tennis program was founded in 1908, but has enjoyed most of its success in recent years.

The Illini have been one of the most successful men's tennis programs in the nation over the past twenty seasons, winning nine consecutive Big Ten Championships from 1997–2005; six of seven Big Ten Tournament Championships between 1999 and 2005; appearing in the NCAA Sweet Sixteen fourteen times, including eight years in a row (2002–09); advancing to three NCAA Final Fours between 2003 and 2007; and winning the 2003 NCAA National Championship.

Illinois men's tennis won two ITA National Team Indoor Championships in 2003 and 2004, and reached the championship match three other times in 1998, 1999, and 2002.

Illinois men's tennis owns the record for longest consecutive win streak in NCAA history at 64 matches, spanning from their first match of the 2002-2003 season and ending with a 4-2 defeat by UCLA in the semifinals of the 2004 NCAA Men's Tennis Tournament.

Individual NCAA Champions

All-Americans

References

External links